Cédric Hountondji (born 19 January 1994) is a professional footballer who plays as a centre-back for  club Angers. Born in France, he plays for the Benin national team.

Club career
Hountondji came through the Rennes youth set-up and made his debut in Ligue 1 on 17 August 2013 against Nice in a 2–1 away defeat. He then spent time on loan at two Ligue 2 clubs, Châteauroux and Auxerre, before moving to fellow Ligue 2 side Gazélec Ajaccio in 2016.

He signed with New York City FC of Major League Soccer on 11 January 2018. He was waived by New York on 28 January 2019.

On 14 March 2019, Hountondji signed with Bulgarian club Levski Sofia until the end of the season with an option for extension.

On 18 July 2022, Hountondji joined Angers on a four-year contract.

International career
Hountondji was born in France and is of Beninese descent. He represented France at various youth international levels.

He debuted for the senior Benin national team in a friendly 1–0 loss with Mauritania on 25 March 2017.

Career statistics

References

Cédric Hountondji à Ajaccio : Les premiers mots du nouveau Corse, benin-finder.net, 22 June 2016

1994 births
Living people
Footballers from Toulouse
Association football defenders
Citizens of Benin through descent
Beninese footballers
Benin international footballers
French footballers
France youth international footballers
France under-21 international footballers
French sportspeople of Beninese descent
Ligue 1 players
Ligue 2 players
Stade Rennais F.C. players
LB Châteauroux players
AJ Auxerre players
Gazélec Ajaccio players
Clermont Foot players
Angers SCO players
New York City FC players
Major League Soccer players
PFC Levski Sofia players
First Professional Football League (Bulgaria) players
French expatriate footballers
Beninese expatriate footballers
Expatriate soccer players in the United States
Expatriate footballers in Bulgaria
French expatriate sportspeople in the United States
Beninese expatriate sportspeople in the United States
French expatriate sportspeople in Bulgaria
Beninese expatriate sportspeople in Bulgaria
Black French sportspeople